Schwarzatal is a Verwaltungsgemeinschaft ("municipal association") in the district Saalfeld-Rudolstadt, in Thuringia, Germany. The seat of the Verwaltungsgemeinschaft is in Schwarzatal. It was created on 1 January 2019.

The Verwaltungsgemeinschaft Schwarzatal consists of the following municipalities:
Cursdorf
Deesbach
Döschnitz
Katzhütte
Meura
Rohrbach
Schwarzatal
Schwarzburg
Sitzendorf
Unterweißbach

References

Verwaltungsgemeinschaften in Thuringia